The 2012–13 Essex Senior Football League season was the 42nd in the history of Essex Senior Football League a football competition in England.

League table

The league featured 17 clubs which competed in the league last season, along with two new clubs:
Great Wakering Rovers, relegated from the Isthmian League
London Bari, joined from the Essex Corinthian Sunday Football League
For this season only, the FA were to promote a second club from two of the following six Step 5 leagues: Combined Counties League, Eastern Counties League, Essex Senior League, Kent League, Spartan South Midlands League and the Sussex County League. This was to fulfil the expansion of the Isthmian League Divisions One North and South from 22 to 24 clubs each.  The two clubs were to be promoted on a points per game basis, and the two runners-up with the best PPG were VCD Athletic (Kent Football League) and Guernsey (Combined Counties League). Three others – Aylesbury United (Spartan South Midlands League), Redhill (Sussex County League) and Barkingside (Essex Senior League) – were also confirmed as promoted by the FA on 17 May, due to resignations and non-promotions elsewhere.
From this league, only Barking, Barkingside, Burnham Ramblers, Enfield 1893, Great Wakering Rovers, London Bari and Takeley have applied for promotion. However, Takeley failed the ground grading, and therefore could not have been promoted.

League table

Results

References

External links
 FA Full-Time League Websites (Essex Senior Football League 2012-13)
 football.mitoo (Essex Senior Football League 2012-2013 Season)

Essex Senior Football League seasons
9